Root of Things is an album by American jazz pianist Matthew Shipp, which was recorded in 2013 and released on Relative Pitch. It was the second studio recording by his trio with Michael Bisio on bass and Whit Dickey on drums.

Reception
In a review for JazzTimes Mike Shanley states "If anyone is still convinced that Shipp doesn’t know how to swing, the walking bass and syncopated chords of 'Jazz It' should prove otherwise."

Track listing
All compositions by Matthew Shipp
 "Root of Things" – 6:33
 "Jazz It" – 9:39
 "Code J" – 4:04
 "Path" – 9:46
 "Pulse Code" – 4:11
 "Solid Circuit" – 9:32

Personnel
Matthew Shipp - piano
Michael Bisio – bass
Whit Dickey – drums

References

2014 albums
Matthew Shipp albums